Lianna Rose is an Australian singer–songwriter.

Career
Signed to Mushroom Music Publishing in 2007, Rose's original songs have appeared on Adam Brand's album Blame it on Eve, Talia Wittmann's debut Reckless Side of Me, and Victoria Baillie's debut Start Brand New.

Her debut album, Soak Up The World released in October 2008, resulted in her first single "Jack" featuring in the Australian film Charlie & Boots starring Paul Hogan and Shane Jacobson. Other songs from the album, "Sugar on It", "Jenny", "Angels", and "Don't Take the Girl", received airplay on Australian soap operas Home and Away and Neighbours.

Rose's third single, "I Want My Tractor Back", resulted in her first top 5 hit single.  The music video for her hit single Directed By Ross Wood of 171 Entertainment featured Australia's Rocker Angry Anderson of Rose Tattoo.

Achievements and honours
Winner of The Golden Saddles Award 2009 for Excellence in the Australian Independent Country Music Industry.
Winner of the Rising Female Artist Award 2009 Southern Stars Independent Music Awards.

3 Gold Guitar Nominations for 2010 C.M.A.A Awards.   Female Artist of the year (Angels), Video Clip of the year (I Want My Tractor Back) New Talent of the year (Jack).

References

External links
 http://www.country.com.au
 http://www.mushroom.com.au

Year of birth missing (living people)
Living people
Australian country singers
Australian singer-songwriters
Place of birth missing (living people)
Australian women singer-songwriters